Nobuyoshi (written: 信吉, 信芳, 信義, 信喜, 信由, 経惟) is a masculine Japanese given name. Notable people with the name include:

, Japanese photographer and artist
, Japanese chief executive
, Japanese sumo wrestler
, Japanese comedian
, Japanese middle distance runner
, Japanese general and diplomat
, Japanese long-distance runner
, Japanese composer and musician
, Japanese daimyō
, Japanese aikidoka
, Japanese daimyō

Japanese masculine given names